Wahsayah Whitebird (born 1992) is a member of the Communist Party of the United States who served from 2019 to 2021 on the City Council of Ashland, Wisconsin, United States. Whitebird is a Native American from the Bad River Band of the Chippewa people and while in office was one of only two Communist Party members serving as an elected official in the United States.

Early life
Whitebird is a member of the Bad River Band of the Lake Superior Tribe of Chippewa Indians, a tribe whose reservation is located about 10 miles east of Ashland on the coast of Lake Superior. Whitebird worked at a deli in Ashland prior to his election and was a member of the United Food and Commercial Workers.

Electoral history
Whitebird won his first election on April 2, 2019, beating incumbent David J. Mettille 52-42. His campaign platform was described as "radical" by the Ashland Daily Press, running on issues like making housing more affordable, reducing drug abuse, and building homeless shelters. The election was nonpartisan, and Whitebird's affiliation with the Communist Party was not publicly known until after he won. Whitebird has been a member of the Communist Party since 2011. His election made him the only known Communist Party member elected to public office in the United States at the time. He did not run for re-election in 2021.

Policy positions
Whitebird's policy positions are generally aligned with those of democratic socialists, though his overall political views and philosophy are more aligned with traditional Communism. Since being elected, Whitebird has announced support for policies like raising the minimum wage and implementing a Green New Deal. Whitebird expressed disdain toward school resource officers in September 2020, saying that removing them from schools was a step towards ending the "school to prison pipeline."

See also
 List of Communist Party USA members who have held office in the United States

References

Bad River Band of the Lake Superior Tribe of Chippewa Indians
Living people
People from Ashland, Wisconsin
Ojibwe people
Communist Party USA politicians
Wisconsin city council members
Wisconsin communists
Wisconsin socialists
1992 births